California Typewriter is a 2016 American documentary film directed by Doug Nichol, that explores the mythology attached to the typewriter, as various obsessives (including Tom Hanks, John Mayer, David McCullough and Sam Shepard) celebrate the physicality of the typewriter both as object and means of summoning the creative spirit.  It also documents the struggles of California Typewriter, one of the last standing repair shops in America dedicated to keeping the aging machines clicking.

Cast
The following people appeared in California Typewriter:
Silvi Alcivar
Ken Alexander
Tom Hanks
Martin Howard
Jeremy Mayer
John Mayer
David McCullough
Herbert Permillion
Richard Polt
Anthony Rocco
Sam Shepard
Darren Wershler
Mason Williams

Reception
The film premiered at the 2016 Telluride Film Festival and was released theatrically to critical acclaim. On review aggregator Rotten Tomatoes, the film holds an approval rating of 100% based on 40 reviews, with an average rating of 8.10/10. The website's critical consensus reads, "California Typewriter is an affectionate, nostalgic love letter to the typed word from enthusiasts and experts alike." On Metacritic, the film has a weighted average score of 80 out of 100 based on 14 critics, indicating "generally favorable reviews".

Owen Gleiberman of Variety wrote, "The movie is a quaintly ingenious meditation on what the digital era is doing to us — how it has taken us a step away from reality, even as it's made everything easier."

References

External links

2016 documentary films
American documentary films
Documentary films about San Francisco
Films set in the San Francisco Bay Area
2010s English-language films
2010s American films